Aldersyde is a hamlet in Alberta, Canada within the Foothills County. The Canadian Pacific Railway Aldersyde subdivision runs through the hamlet.

The name "Aldersyde" was coined by a first settler for its Scottish sound, although apparently there is no place in Scotland with the same name.

Demographics 
The population of Aldersyde according to the 2003 municipal census conducted by Foothills County is 64.

See also 
List of communities in Alberta
List of hamlets in Alberta

References 

Foothills County
Hamlets in Alberta